The Sassnitz campaign was a military campaign between Swedish and Prussian forces from 1757 to 1762, during the Seven Years' War. It took place around Sassnitz, in Pomerania. At the end of the campaign Sweden remained in control of the area.

References

Seven Years' War